Tori Sparks (born December 5, 1983) is an American singer-songwrite based in Barcelona, Spain, having relocated from Nashville, TN.

Discography

Albums and EPs

Vinyl

Videos

Singles

Compilations
 Sin City Sampler: Volume 13 (Sin City Media, 2010)
 Dewey Beach Music Fest Sampler (DBMF, 2009)
 Paste Magazine New Music Sampler #54 (GoGirls Music, 2009)
 Paste Magazine New Music Sampler #54 (Paste Media Group, 2009)
 Project Cure Compilation 2008 (Project Cure, 2008)
 Paste Magazine New Music Sampler (Paste Media Group, 2008)
 Country Vol. 2 (double-disc) (Universal Music France, 2008)
 Moozikoo Best of Indies (Digital Release Only) (Moozikoo.com, 2008)
 KSYM-FM Camp Victory Compilation for the Troops (SCOOP KSYM-FM, 2007)
 MSMF Multiple Sclerosis Music Fest 2006 Compilation CD (Montel Williams MS Foundation, 2006)
 Canadian Music Week Best Unsigned Artists of 2006 (Tunetank, 2006)
 A Taste of Triple A #16 Compilation (A Taste of Triple A, 2006)
 World Music From Catalonia 2015 (Creative Catalonia/Government of Catalonia, 2015)
 World Music From Catalonia 2017 (Creative Catalonia/Government of Catalonia, 2015)

References

External links
 ToriSparks.com
 Glass Mountain Records
 Tori Sparks at AllMusic

1983 births
American women singer-songwriters
American rock songwriters
American rock singers
Women rock singers
American rock guitarists
Living people
Florida State University alumni
21st-century American women singers
21st-century American singers
21st-century American women guitarists